Novobikmetovo (Yañı Bikmät) is a rural locality (a village) in Vostretsovsky Selsoviet, Burayevsky District, Bashkortostan, Russia. The population was 425 as of 2010. There are 7 streets.

Geography 
Novobikmetovo is located 34 km southwest of Burayevo (the district's administrative centre) by road. Chelkakovo is the nearest rural locality.

References 

Rural localities in Burayevsky District